Craig Sharpe (born 23 September 1989) is a Canadian pop singer who was the runner-up on Canadian Idol 4, having finished a close second behind winner Eva Avila. He came through seven rounds of auditions judged by Canadian Idol's four-member panel. Sharpe is the second contestant from the small community of Upper Island Cove, Newfoundland and Labrador (Jason Greeley from season two was the first), and the fourth contestant from the province of Newfoundland and Labrador.

Sharpe is notable for his countertenor voice.

Early life
Born in Carbonear, Newfoundland, Sharpe attended Ascension Collegiate, Bay Roberts, where he excelled at music and geography. When not composing music, he said his pastimes included spending time with his pets and playing basketball, volleyball and badminton.

Canadian Idol 
Sharpe was the runner-up on Canadian Idol in season four, and lost the closest Idol race to date to Gatineau native Eva Avila by just 131 000 votes out of nearly 4 million cast.

Performances and results

Post Idol 
When asked during a CTV interview what one person he would like to meet, Sharpe named Selena Quintanilla Perez: "She put a lot of work into what she loved and she didn't get to express her talent." 

When asked what song he is touched by the most, he replied "You're Beautiful by James Blunt, because it reminds me of my music teacher Heather Macdonald, who died at the young age of 28." 

He also shared the stage with music producer David Foster, in 2008. He performed his own rendition of Angels, with a children's choir.

Sharpe has reportedly auditioned for a role in the TV series Glee with the song "And I'm Telling You I'm Not Going."

He now lives in Newfoundland.

Discography

Albums
I Am (February 2007)
Craig Sharpe (April 2015)

Singles
When They Know Your Name (January 2007)

Featured
Canadian Idol: Spotlights (August 2006)

References

External links

 The Compass newspaper article
 Craig's official CTV bio

1989 births
Canadian Christians
Canadian Idol participants
Canadian pop singers
Living people
Musicians from Newfoundland and Labrador
Canadian child singers
People from Carbonear
21st-century Canadian male singers